The Department of Computer Science and Technology, formerly the Computer Laboratory, is the computer science department of the University of Cambridge.  it employed 56 faculty members, 45 support staff, 105 research staff, and about 205 research students. The current Head of Department is Professor Ann Copestake.

History 
The Department was founded as the Mathematical Laboratory under the leadership of John Lennard-Jones on 14 May 1937, though it did not get properly established until after World War II. The new laboratory was housed in the North Wing of the former Anatomy School, on the New Museums Site. Upon its foundation, it was intended "to provide a computing service for general use, and to be a centre for the development of computational techniques in the University". The Cambridge Diploma in Computer Science was the world's first postgraduate taught course in computing, starting in 1953.

In October 1946, work began under Maurice Wilkes on EDSAC (Electronic Delay Storage Automatic Calculator), which subsequently became the world's first fully operational and practical stored program computer when it ran its first program on 6 May 1949. It inspired the world's first business computer, LEO. It was replaced by EDSAC 2, the first microcoded and bitsliced computer, in 1958.

In 1961, David Hartley developed Autocode, one of the first high-level programming languages, for EDSAC 2. Also in that year, proposals for Titan, based on the Ferranti Atlas machine, were developed. Titan became fully operational in 1964 and EDSAC 2 was retired the following year. In 1967, a full ('24/7') multi-user time-shared service for up to 64 users was inaugurated on Titan.

In 1970, the Mathematical Laboratory was renamed the Computer Laboratory, with separate departments for Teaching and Research and the Computing Service, providing computing services to the university and its colleges. The two did not fully separate until 2001, when the Computer Laboratory moved out to the new William Gates building in West Cambridge, off Madingley Road, leaving behind an independent Computing Service.

In 2002, the Computer Laboratory launched the Cambridge Computer Lab Ring, a graduate society named after the Cambridge Ring network.

Current 

On 30 June 2017, the Cambridge University Reporter announced that the Computer Laboratory would change its name to the Department of Computer Science and Technology from 1 October 2017, to reflect the broadened scope of its purpose and activities.

The Department currently offers a 3-year undergraduate course and a 1-year masters course (with a large selection of specialised courses in various research areas). Recent research has focused on virtualisation, security, usability, formal verification, formal semantics of programming languages, computer architecture, natural language processing, mobile computing, wireless networking, biometric identification, robotics, routing, positioning systems and sustainability ("Computing for the future of the planet"). Members have been involved in the creation of many successful UK IT companies such as Acorn, ARM, nCipher and XenSource.

Staff

Professors
, the lab employed 19 professors. Notable ones include:

 Ross J. Anderson, Professor of Security Engineering
 Alan F. Blackwell, Professor of Interdisciplinary Design
Ann Copestake, Professor of Computational Linguistics
 Jon Crowcroft, Marconi Professor of Communications Systems 
 John Daugman, Professor of Computer Vision and Pattern Recognition
 Andy Hopper, Professor of Computer Technology
Neil Lawrence, Deepmind Professor of machine learning
Cecilia Mascolo, Professor of Mobile Systems
Alan Mycroft, Professor of Computing
 Lawrence Paulson, Professor of Computational Logic
 Peter Robinson, Professor of Computer Technology

Other notable staff include Sue Sentance, Robert Watson, Markus Kuhn.

Former staff
Former staff include:

 Jean Bacon
 James Davenport
 Andrew D. Gordon
 Philip Hazel
 Robin Milner
 Roger Needham
 Martin Richards
 Karen Spärck Jones
 David Wheeler
 Maurice Wilkes
 Neil Wiseman
 Neil Dodgson
 Mike Gordon

Heads of the Computer Laboratory 
The lab has been led by:
 1949 Maurice Wilkes
 1980 Roger Needham
 1996 Robin Milner
 1999 Ian Leslie
 2004 Andy Hopper
 2018 Ann Copestake

Achievements and innovations 
Members have made impact in computers, Turing machines,
microprogramming, subroutines, computer networks, mobile protocols, security, 
programming languages, kernels, OS, security, virtualisation, location badge
systems, etc. Below is a list.

 EDSAC – world's first practical stored program electronic computer (1949–1958)
 Subroutine (1951)
 OXO – world's first video game (1952)
 EDSAC 2 (1958–1965)
 Autocode – one of the first high-level programming languages (1961)
 Titan – early multi-user time-share computer (1964–1973)
 Phoenix – IBM 370 with locally developed OS and hardware extensions (1973–1995)
 TRIPOS operating system – became later the basis for AmigaDOS
 BCPL programming language – ancestor of C
 CAP computer – hardware support for capability-based security
 Cambridge Ring – an early local area network
 Cambridge Distributed Computing System
 Trojan Room coffee pot – the world's first webcam (1993)
 Iris recognition – biometric identification with vanishingly small false-accept rate
 Nemesis – real-time microkernel OS
 Active Badge System –
 Active Bat – ultrasonic indoor positioning system
 Xen – virtual machine monitor (2003–present)
 Isabelle and HOL – interactive theorem provers

Impact on business enterprise 

A number of companies have been founded by staff and graduates. Their names were featured in the new entrance in 2012. Some cited examples of successful companies are ARM, Autonomy, Aveva, CSR and Domino. One common factor they share is that key staff or founder members are "drenched in university training and research". The Cambridge Computer Lab Ring was praised for its "tireless work" by Andy Hopper in 2012, at its tenth anniversary dinner.

Notable alumni (industries) 

 Demis Hassabis 
 Eben Upton 
 Bjarne Stroustrup 
 John Bates 
 Ian Pratt 
 Simon Crosby 
 David L Tennenhouse 
 Michael Burrows 
 Andrew Herbert 
 Andy Harter
 Andy Hopper

References 

 
Cambridge Computer Laboratory
Cambridge Computer Laboratory
Computer Science and Technology, Department of
Computer Science and Technology, Department of
History of computing in the United Kingdom
Cambridge Computer Laboratory